Rezart Taçi (born in Tirana) is an  Albanian businessman who is most known for being the creator and CEO of Taçi Oil.

Biography
Rezart Taçi was born and raised in Tirana, Albania.  In 1998, he began a career in the trading industry of finished oil products where he worked to establish his name. Mr. Taci has established a portfolio of companies in Energy and Media. In 2003 Taci established Taçi Oil International Trading and Supply Company Sh.A (Taci Oil). At its inception the company had only six employees and leased storage facilities in Shëngjin-Lezhë, a port on the northern coast of Albania.  Later, Taçi Oil acquired this facility and expanded operations with additional tankers and added facilities in Porto-Durrës.  The combined storage for the two facilities is over 80,000 cubic meters and expanding. In 2004,  Taçi established Anika Enterprises S.A. (ANIKA), a Switzerland-based company acting as the trading arm of Taçi Oil, to support his operations and expand his international partnerships.  In 2006, Taci established KUID Sh.p.k (KUID) in order to expand into the retail sector of refined products.  The company began by operating 29 petrol stations. By 2009 the network of petrol stations had expanded to 84.  As of 2012 there were over 300 Taci Oil petrol stations and 1400 employees. In 2008, Taci participated in the international tender for the privatization of Albanian Refining and Marketing of Oil Sh.A (ARMO). Ta0i was awarded the tender and acquired 85% of the shares of ARMO.  In 2013 Taçi Oil sold 80% of the assets of ARMO, the oil refining business to Heaney Assets Corporation, an Azerbaijan corporation.

References

http://time.ikub.al/Lajme/6298dca6f6/Padia-nga-qeveria-e-re-prokuroria-nis-hetimet-ndaj-Rezart-Tacit-e-familjes.aspx

http://www.lajm-shqip.com/en/2013/12/criminal-charges-rezart-taci-and-his-family-are-charged-with-tax-evasion-source-balkanweb-www-balkanweb-com/

http://www.top-channel.tv/english/artikull.php?id=10682

1971 births
Living people
People from Kolonjë
Albanian businesspeople
People from Tirana
Parma Calcio 1913 chairmen and investors